Lycoa or Lykoa, was a town in ancient Arcadia in the district Maenalia, at the foot of Mount Maenalus, with a temple of Artemis Lycoatis. It was in ruins in the time of Pausanias (2nd century).

Its site is tentatively located south of the modern Davia.

References

Populated places in ancient Arcadia
Former populated places in Greece